Leck is a civil parish in the English county of Lancashire. The parish of Leck had a population of 189 recorded in the 2001 census. In the 2011 census Leck was grouped with Ireby (2001 pop. 78) to give a total of 260.

The Church of St Peter was built in 1878-79 and burnt down in 1913, but was accurately re-built in 1915.

Geology
Leck is located on two ancient geological fault lines: the Dent Fault and the Craven Fault.
In the Carboniferous to Jurassic periods these major earth movements formed the dramatic landscape of Lonsdale and the Aire Gap in Craven District

See also
 Listed buildings in Leck, Lancashire

References

External links

Geography of the City of Lancaster
Civil parishes in Lancashire